Hydrobromic acid is a strong acid formed by dissolving the diatomic molecule hydrogen bromide (HBr) in water. Hydrobromic acid is one of the strongest mineral acids known.

Uses
Hydrobromic acid is mainly used for the production of inorganic bromides, especially the bromides of zinc, calcium, and sodium.  It is a useful reagent for generating organobromine compounds.  Certain ethers are cleaved with HBr. It also catalyzes alkylation reactions and the extraction of certain ores. Industrially significant organic compounds prepared from hydrobromic acid include allyl bromide, tetrabromobis(phenol), and bromoacetic acid.  HBr almost uniquely participates in anti-Markovnikov hydrohalogenation of alkenes.  The resulting 1-bromoalkanes are versatile alkylating agents, giving rise to fatty amines and quaternary ammonium salts.

Synthesis
Hydrobromic acid can be prepared in the laboratory via the reaction of Br2, SO2, and water.

Br2 + SO2 + 2 H2O → H2SO4 + 2 HBr

More typically laboratory preparations involve the production of anhydrous HBr, which is then dissolved in water.

Hydrobromic acid has commonly been prepared industrially by reacting bromine with either sulfur or phosphorus and water.  However, it can also be produced electrolytically. It can also be prepared by treating bromides with non-oxidising acids like phosphoric or acetic acids.

Alternatively the acid can be prepared with dilute (5.8M) sulfuric acid and potassium bromide:

H2SO4 + KBr → KHSO4 + HBr

Using more concentrated sulfuric acid or allowing the reaction solution to exceed 75 °C further oxidizes HBr to bromine gas. The acid is further purified by filtering out the KHSO4 and by distilling off the water until the solution reaches an azeotrope (≈ 126 °C at 760 torr). The yield is approximately 85%.

Hydrobromic acid is available commercially in various concentrations and purities.

References

External links

 International Chemical Safety Card 0282
 NIOSH Pocket Guide to Chemical Hazards
Carlin, W. W. 

Bromides
Nonmetal halides
Mineral acids

pl:Bromowodór#Kwas bromowodorowy